Manganeses de la Lampreana is a municipality located in the province of Zamora, Castile and León, Spain. According to the 2004 census (INE), the municipality has a population of 696 inhabitants.

See also
Tierra de Campos

References

Municipalities of the Province of Zamora